Butlerian is an eponymous adjective that may refer to:

Judith Butler (born 1956), American philosopher involved with feminism, queer theory, and ethics
Samuel Butler (1835–1902), iconoclastic Victorian author
Octavia E. Butler (1947-2006), American science fiction author in references to the themes in her books